The Grand Prix de la Somme (formerly the Tour de la Somme) is a single-day road bicycle race held annually in May in Somme, France.

List of winners

External links
 Palmarès by memoire-du-cyclisme.net 
 UCI profile of the race

Recurring sporting events established in 1986
1986 establishments in France
Cycle races in France
UCI Europe Tour races
Sport in Somme (department)